The 2005 Major League Soccer All-Star Game was the 10th Major League Soccer All-Star Game, played on July 30, 2005 at Columbus Crew Stadium in Columbus, Ohio between the MLS All-Stars and Fulham of England. The MLS All-Stars earned a 4–1 victory.

Halftime entertainment was provided by Bowling for Soup.

Match details

References

External links
 Match report on the MLS website

All-Star Game
MLS All-Star Game
Mls All-Star Game 2005
Soccer in Ohio
MLS All-Star
Sports competitions in Columbus, Ohio
21st century in Columbus, Ohio
July 2005 sports events in the United States